Gordon Hall Gerould, B.A., B.Litt. (1877 – April 10, 1953) was a philologist and folklorist of the United States.

Born in Goffstown, New Hampshire, he joined the faculty of Bryn Mawr College and was a professor of English at Princeton University. In 1910 he married fellow writer Katharine Elizabeth Fullerton Gerould. He served in the U.S. Army, holding the rank of  captain in 1918.

Selected bibliography
 The North England Homily Collection (1902) 
 Sir Guy of Warwick (1905) 
 Selected Essays of Fielding (1905) 
 The Grateful Dead: The History of a Folk Story (1908) 
 Saints' Legends (1916) 
 Peter Sanders, Retired (1920)

References

 Biographical note Gordon Hall Gerould Papers, 1904-1953, Department of Rare Books and Special Collections, Princeton University Library.

External links

 
 

1877 births
1953 deaths
20th-century American novelists
American educators
American folklorists
American male novelists
American philologists
People from Goffstown, New Hampshire
Translators from Old English
20th-century translators
20th-century American male writers
Fellows of the Medieval Academy of America